"Broken Again" is a song by American rock band Another Animal and the lead single from their self-titled album.

Chart positions

Singles 
Billboard (North America)

2007 singles
American hard rock songs
2007 songs
Universal Records singles
Songs written by Tony Rombola
Songs written by Whitfield Crane